The Fisher Center for Alzheimer's Research Foundation is an American nonprofit organization that supports research into the causes and treatment of Alzheimer’s disease. The organization's mission is to “understand the causes of Alzheimer's disease, improve the care of people living with it, and find a cure.”  The Foundation is funded through donations from the public.

Zachary Fisher, a New York City businessman and philanthropist, founded the organization in 1995 after his wife, Elizabeth Fisher, developed Alzheimer's disease. He teamed up with philanthropist David Rockefeller to establish the Zachary and Elizabeth M. Fisher Center for Research on Alzheimer's Disease at The Rockefeller University. Since its founding, the Fisher Center Foundation has primarily supported the research conducted at the Fisher Center Laboratory, which until 2019 was under the direction of Nobel Laureate Dr. Paul Greengard.

The Foundation also publishes educational material for the public. Since 2007, the Foundation has published Preserving Your Memory magazine, a subscription-based publication for consumers. The magazine has interviewed the caregivers of high-profile individuals suffering from Alzheimer's, as well as written features about high-profile caregivers themselves. It also publishes educational features, such as on the COVID-19 pandemic.

History 

When his wife, Elizabeth Fisher, was diagnosed with Alzheimer's Disease, her husband, New York City real estate developer and philanthropist Zachary Fisher, partnered with their friend David Rockefeller to start the Zachary and Elizabeth M. Fisher Center for Research on Alzheimer's Disease at The Rockefeller University (the Fisher Center Lab) in New York City.

Dr. Paul Greengard led the Fisher Center Lab as its director from its founding until his death in 2019. Since then, the lab has been led by interim Laboratory Head Dr. Marc Flajolet and advised by a Neuroscience Advisory Committee featuring multiple Nobel Laureates and faculty from The Rockefeller University.

The Fisher Center for Alzheimer's Research Foundation, a 501(c)(3) charitable organization, was founded by Zachary Fisher and David Rockefeller in 1995. The Foundation raises funds via contributions from the public, with most of those funds going to support the Fisher Center Lab, although the foundation also funds other Alzheimer's research around the globe. The Fisher Center Foundation has been designated a four-star charity by Charity Navigator every year since 2010, and received a Gold Seal of Transparency from Guidestar every year since 2018.

The longtime President and CEO of the Foundation was Kent Karosen, a New York City-based businessman and philanthropist. Karosen was also the co-author, along with Chana Stiefel, of Why Can't Grandma Remember My Name?, a children's book about Alzheimer's disease published by the Foundation in 2016. Karosen died in 2018. The Foundation is currently led by chairman of the board Barry R. Sloane and Executive Director Lucretia Holden.

Partnership with Rockefeller University 

Since its founding in 1995, the Fisher Center Foundation has financially supported the Zachary and Elizabeth M. Fisher Center for Research on Alzheimer's Disease at The Rockefeller University.

In addition to their regular financial support, in 2017 the Foundation established the Paul Greengard Professorship at Rockefeller University, in honor of longtime Fisher Center director and Nobel Laureate Paul Greengard.

In 2021, the Foundation announced the endowment of another professorship at Rockefeller University, to be named the Zachary and Elizabeth M. Fisher Professorship in Alzheimer's and Neurodegenerative Disease. Since 2021, the Professorship has been held by Professor Sidney Strickland.

Preserving Your Memory 

Since 2007, the Foundation has published Preserving Your Memory, a triannual magazine available to subscribers and distributed to medical professionals nationally. The magazine is also made available for free on the Foundation website.

The magazine has interviewed the caregivers of high-profile individuals suffering from Alzheimer's, as well as written features about high-profile caregivers themselves. It also provides educational materials, updates on discoveries in neuroscience, and brainteaser puzzles.

References

External links 

 Preserving Your Memory magazine

Organizations established in 1995
1995 establishments in New York City
Non-profit organizations based in New York City
Organizations based in Manhattan
Medical and health foundations in the United States
Alzheimer's and dementia organizations